Rudolf Jordan may refer to:

 Rudolf Jordan (politician) (1902-1988), German Nazi politician
 Rudolf Jordan (painter) (1810-1887), German painter